Paulding High School is a public high school in Paulding, Ohio.  It is the only high school in the Paulding Exempted Village Schools district. It is Paulding's second high school.

References

External links
 District Website

High schools in Paulding County, Ohio
Public high schools in Ohio